is railway station on the Kyūdai Main Line operated by JR Kyushu in Kurume, Fukuoka Prefecture, Japan. The station name refers to the nearby Kurume High School.

Lines 
Only local trains on the line stop at the station.

Layout 
The station consists of an island platform serving two tracks on a low embankment. The station building is an old wooden building in traditional Japanese style with a staffed ticket window. An underpass leads under the embankment and up to the island platform.

Management of the station has been outsourced to the JR Kyushu Tetsudou Eigyou Co., a wholly owned subsidiary of JR Kyushu specialising in station services. It staffs the ticket counter which is equipped with a POS machine but does not have a Midori no Madoguchi facility.

Adjacent stations

History
Minami-Kurume was opened on the same day as one of several intermediate stations on the track. With the privatization of Japanese National Railways (JNR), the successor of JGR, on 1 April 1987, JR Kyushu took over control of the station.

Passenger statistics
In fiscal 2016, the station was used by an average of 424 passengers daily (boarding passengers only), and it ranked 259th among the busiest stations of JR Kyushu.

References

External links
Minami-Kurume (JR Kyushu)

Railway stations in Fukuoka Prefecture
Railway stations in Japan opened in 1928